Clivina mocquerysi is a species of ground beetle in the subfamily Scaritinae. It was described by Alluaud in 1935.

References

mocquerysi
Beetles described in 1935